Biathlon at the 2011 Winter Universiade were held in Dumlu District in Erzurum, Turkey. The nine events were scheduled for January 29 - February 5, 2011.

Men's events

Women's events

Mixed Event

Medal table

References

2011 in biathlon
Biathlon
2011